Cyrillic Supplement is a Unicode block containing Cyrillic letters for writing several minority languages, including Abkhaz, Kurdish, Komi, Mordvin, Aleut, Azerbaijani, and Jakovlev's Chuvash orthography.

Block

History
The following Unicode-related documents record the purpose and process of defining specific characters in the Cyrillic Supplement block:

References 

Unicode blocks